Operation Parsnip was a World War II operation by the Netherlands East Indies Forces Intelligence Service on the island of Java. Troops were landed by submarine on 6 June 1945. The party was spotted by the Japanese and picked up; two were killed.

On 6–8 June 1945, the Dutch submarine  unsuccessfully tried three times to land the NEFIS shore party 'Parsnip' shore party and supplies at the coast of Mandalika, north coast of Java. The shore party was under the command of Lt. Abimanjoe.

References

Military operations involving the Netherlands
Military operations of World War II involving Australia